Balladonia Land District is a land district (cadastral division) of Western Australia mostly within the Eucla Land Division. It spans roughly 31°50'S - 32°40'S in latitude and 123°10'E - 124°00'E in longitude.

Location and features
The district is located on the Nullarbor Plain and contains the town of Balladonia. The Eyre Highway runs through the district.

History
The district was approved on 3 September 1897 by the Commissioner of Crown Lands. As it was approved prior to the Land Act 1898, its boundaries were never gazetted.

References

Land districts of Western Australia
Goldfields-Esperance